Koh-Lanta: L'Île au Trésor was the sixteenth season of the French version of Survivor, Koh-Lanta. The main twist this season is that there is an island separated from the two tribes known as Treasure Island. On the island is a buried chest which contains the Golden Ring, an item which secures the owner a spot in the final five. In order to open the chest, the contestants must find ten metallic pieces, each of which points to the next marker. Once all ten pieces are found, the chest can be opened.

The season premiered on 26 August 2016 and concluded on 9 December where Benoît Assadi was crowned the title of Sole Survivor in a unanimous 10-0 jury vote against Jesta Hillmann.

Contestants

Future appearances
Candice Boisson, Jérémy Raffin and Julie Navarro-Camilleri later returned for Koh-Lanta: Le Combat des Héros. Boisson returned for a third time for Koh-Lanta: La Légende.

Future appearances (Fort Boyard)
Candice Boisson and Jérémy Raffin later returned for Fort Boyard 2019.

Notes

References

External links

Koh-Lanta seasons
2016 French television seasons
Television shows filmed in Cambodia